Kristián Kolčák (born 30 January 1990) is a Slovak football defender who currently plays for SV Stripfing.

Career

Club
On 18 July 2007, Kolčák made his Corgoň Liga debut in the 4–1 home win against Dubnica at the age of 17.

On 15 July 2017, Kolčák signed for Kazakhstan Premier League side Aktobe.

References

External links
 
 ŠK Slovan profile 
 Player profile at wspsoccer.com
 

1990 births
Living people
Footballers from Bratislava
Association football midfielders
Slovak footballers
Slovak expatriate footballers
Slovakia youth international footballers
Slovakia under-21 international footballers
ŠK Slovan Bratislava players
FK Dubnica players
Slovak Super Liga players
Podbeskidzie Bielsko-Biała players
MFK Ružomberok players
Gyirmót FC Győr players
FC Aktobe players
Szombathelyi Haladás footballers
FC Petržalka players
FC Nitra players
Ekstraklasa players
Kazakhstan Premier League players
Expatriate footballers in Poland
Expatriate footballers in Hungary
Expatriate footballers in Kazakhstan
Slovak expatriate sportspeople in Poland
Slovak expatriate sportspeople in Hungary
Slovak expatriate sportspeople in Kazakhstan
Slovak expatriate sportspeople in Austria